The Bostwick Railroad was constructed in 1907 between Bostwick, Georgia and Apalachee, Georgia in the United.  It failed in 1912 and was purchased by the Greene County Railroad.

Defunct Georgia (U.S. state) railroads